Naguyevo is a rural locality (a village) in Oktyabrskoye Rural Settlement, Vyaznikovsky District, Vladimir Oblast, Russia. The population was 11 as of 2010.

Geography 
Naguyevo is located 18 km southwest of Vyazniki (the district's administrative centre) by road. Starygino is the nearest rural locality.

References 

Rural localities in Vyaznikovsky District
Vyaznikovsky Uyezd